Air Vice Marshal Arthur Daniel Button  (26 May 1916 – 27 May 1991) was a Royal Air Force officer.

He was educated at Ilford County High School and University College, Southampton (later the University of Southampton; BSc Hons (Lond.)).

He joined the RAF Educational Service in 1938. He married Eira Waterhouse in 1944. He was on general duties, 1941-6; his pilot experience during this time was mainly for instructional purposes.  In 1946 he received the Queen's Commendation for Valuable Service in the Air, and returned to the RAF Education Branch. He was a senior maths instructor until 1949, followed by other varied duties such as armament staff officer at HQ RAF Bomber Command. He rose to become Director of the RAF Educational Services 1972–6.

After his retirement, he was director of the Association of Recognised English Language Schools (ARELS) Examinations Trust, 1976–86. He was a member of the council of the RAF Benevolent Fund and the RAF Association, 1980-9 and the Lord Kitchener National Memorial Fund, 1983–1991. He was Honorary President, ARELS-FELCO (Federation of English Language Course Organisations), from 1990 and a governor of the Duke of Kent School, 1981–6.

He was appointed an Officer of the Order of the British Empire in 1959 and a Companion of the Order of the Bath in 1976.

Footnotes

References
Who's Who 1976

1916 births
1991 deaths
Companions of the Order of the Bath
Officers of the Order of the British Empire
Recipients of the Commendation for Valuable Service in the Air
People educated at Ilford County High School
Royal Air Force air marshals
Royal Air Force personnel of World War II
20th-century English educators
Alumni of the University of Southampton
People from Ilford